Jean-Baptiste Ngnetchopa (born 1953) is a Cameroonian woodcarver.  He achieved international attention from a series of banknotes from Africa carved in wood.  He has appeared in international exhibitions and shows like Africa hoy in 1991.

Background 
Ngnetchopa was born to a family of traditional woodcarvers from a village of the Bamileke people in Cameroun. At age 16, he entered into a seven-year apprenticeship. 

Ngnetchopa's work has evolved into  an exploration of, "the relationship among art, power and money" that balances between the worlds of pop-culture and contemporary art. His banknotes utilize black ink on the wood panels to highlight the carved and incised details. 

Ngnetchopa has said  that, "Some rich people put their money in a vault. This money is dormant and loses value. I ask these rich people to surrender part of this money to me and I will carve them money of wood which they can live with and show to others. And this wooden money will also acquire value."

Exhibitions

2011
Art et Argent, liaisons dangereuses, Monnaie de Paris, Paris, France.
Virtual exhibition (The Contemporary African Art Collection)

2001
Platea dell’ Umanità – 49° Biennale di Venezia
Giardini di Castello / Arsenale – Venice VE, Italy (The Contemporary African Art Collection)

1991
Africa hoy
Atlantic Center of Modern Art.
Las Palmas Gran Canary - Spain. (The Contemporary African Art Collection)

References

Woodcarvers
Cameroonian artists